Manitoba Provincial Road 493 (PR 493) is an unpaved gravel road located in the Canadian province of Manitoba.

Route description 
PR 493's southern terminus is a junction with PR 391 in Leaf Rapids. Nearly  into the route, it crosses Ruttan Lake. PR 493 then continues northeast, and passes Issett Lake. The route's northern terminus is in downtown South Indian Lake.

References

External links
Manitoba Highway Maps

 

493